The 1974 United States Senate election in Ohio took place on November 3, 1974. It was concurrent with elections to the United States House of Representatives. Incumbent Democratic U.S Senator Howard Metzenbaum was running for election his first full term after he was appointed in 1974 by Ohio governor John J. Gilligan to fill out the Senate term of William B. Saxbe, who had resigned to become United States Attorney General. Metzenbaum lost the primary election to John Glenn, who went on to win the general election and win every county in the state. Metzenbaum would later be elected in the other U.S. Senate seat in 1976 and worked with Glenn until he retired from the post in 1994.

Democratic primary

Candidates 
John Glenn, retired astronaut
Howard Metzenbaum, incumbent U.S. Senator

The Democratic Primary that year was seen as competitive between John Glenn, a former Astronaut, and Howard Metzenbaum, the incumbent senator, a rematch in the 1970 senate race primary in Ohio.

Results

See also 
 1974 United States Senate elections

References

Ohio
1974
1974 Ohio elections
John Glenn